George Boscawen (born 4 September 1745) was a British politician who sat in the House of Commons from 1768 to 1780.

Boscawen was the son of Lieutenant-General George Boscawen. He attended Eton College from 1754 to 1761.

In 1768 he was elected to Parliament for St Mawes, and in 1774 for Truro. In the latter year he was commissioned an ensign in the 4th Regiment of Foot.

In May 1776 he quit England to France with Annabella, wife of Sir Patrick Blake, 1st Baronet, and daughter of Sir William Bunbury, 5th Baronet. They remained abroad until 1779. Boscawen did not stand in the general election of 1780.

References

1745 births
Year of death missing
People educated at Eton College
King's Own Royal Regiment officers
British MPs 1768–1774
British MPs 1774–1780
Members of the Parliament of Great Britain for St Mawes
Members of the Parliament of Great Britain for Truro